The Sovereign or Grand Master is the head of the Order of the Golden Fleece. Prior to the Napoleonic wars the Grand Master was always identical with the monarch controlling the Spanish or Austrian Netherlands, although afterwards the order split into separate Austrian and Spanish branches.

The present Grand Master of the Austrian order is Karl von Habsburg; that of the Spanish order is the Felipe VI of Spain.

List of Grand Masters of the Burgundian Golden Fleece

 Philip the Good, Duke of Burgundy
 Charles the Bold, Duke of Burgundy

List of Grand Masters of the Habsburg Golden Fleece
 Maximilian I, Holy Roman Emperor
 Philip I of Castile
 Charles V, Holy Roman Emperor
 Philip II of Spain
 Philip III of Spain
 Philip IV of Spain
 Charles II of Spain

List of Grand Masters of the Spanish Golden Fleece

List of Grand Masters of the Austrian Golden Fleece
 Leopold I, Holy Roman Emperor
 Joseph I, Holy Roman Emperor
 Charles VI, Holy Roman Emperor
 Francis I, Holy Roman Emperor
 Joseph II, Holy Roman Emperor
 Leopold II, Holy Roman Emperor
 Francis II, Holy Roman Emperor, later Francis I, Emperor of Austria
 Ferdinand I of Austria
 Franz Joseph I of Austria
 Charles I of Austria
 Otto von Habsburg
 Karl von Habsburg

See also
 List of Knights of the Order of the Golden Fleece

References

 
Golden Fleece